"All Tied Up" is a song co-written and recorded by American country music artist Ronnie McDowell.  It was released in April 1986 as the first single and partial title track from his album All Tied Up in Love.  The song reached #6 on the Billboard Hot Country Singles chart in July 1986 and #1 on the RPM Country Tracks chart in Canada.  It was written by McDowell, Buddy Killen and Joe Meador.

Chart performance

References

1986 singles
Ronnie McDowell songs
Songs written by Buddy Killen
Song recordings produced by Buddy Killen
MCA Records singles
Curb Records singles
1986 songs
Songs written by Ronnie McDowell